Hong Kong Legislative Council candidates' disqualification controversy  may refer to:
2016 Hong Kong Legislative Council candidates' disqualification controversy
2020 Hong Kong Legislative Council candidates' disqualification controversy